Hoàng Su Phì is a rural district of Hà Giang province in the Northeast region of Vietnam.  the district had a population of 66 683. The district covers an area of 629 km². The district capital lies at Vinh Quang. Hoàng Su Phì is famous for its rice field terraces, especially on the road between Hoàng Su Phì and Xín Mần, where those terraces are classified as a National Heritage by the Vietnamese Government.

Administrative divisions
Hoàng Su Phì District consists of the district capital, Vinh Quang, and 24 communes: Bản Luốc, Bản Máy, Bản Nhùng, Bản Péo, Bản Phùng, Chiến Phố, Đản Ván, Hồ Thầu, Nam Sơn, Nàng Đôn, Nậm Dịch, Nậm Khòa, Nậm Ty, Ngàm Đăng Vài, Pố Lồ, Pờ Ly Ngài, Sán Xả Hồ, Tả Sử Choóng, Tân Tiến, Thàng Tín, Thèn Chu Phìn, Thông Nguyên, Tụ Nhân and Túng Sán.

References

Districts of Hà Giang province
Hà Giang province